Placer County Big Trees Grove is a small, isolated giant sequoia grove located along Mosquito Ridge Road in the American River watershed of Tahoe National Forest, California. It is known for being the northernmost and furthest removed of all giant sequoia groves.

The grove contains six old-growth giant sequoias, two of which are of considerable size. The trees occupy a small, bowl-shaped depression with a small seasonal creek flowing through it. The grove itself has never been logged. Four of the six trees are named after World War I veterans.

Noteworthy trees
The Joffre Tree: the tallest and second largest tree of the grove.

See also
List of giant sequoia groves

References

Giant sequoia groves
Sequoiadendron
Tahoe National Forest
Protected areas of Placer County, California